Riccardo Urbani (born 11 September 1958) is an Italian former swimmer. He competed in the men's 100 metre butterfly at the 1976 Summer Olympics.

References

External links
 

1958 births
Living people
Olympic swimmers of Italy
Swimmers at the 1976 Summer Olympics
Swimmers from Rome
Italian male butterfly swimmers